Asiatheriidae ("Asian opossums") is an family of Cretaceous metatherians in the order  Asiadelphia.  Different from the Ameridelphia, they lacked a prominent distolateral process on the scaphoid, and possessed a more slender fibula.  The masseteric fossa is deeper in this group than the true marsupials.

Further reading
Zofia Kielan-Jaworowska, Richard L. Cifelli, and Zhe-Xi Luo, Mammals from the Age of Dinosaurs: Origins, Evolution, and Structure (New York: Columbia University Press, 2004), 15, 451–452.

Prehistoric metatherians
Coniacian genus first appearances
Campanian genus extinctions
Fossil taxa described in 1994
Prehistoric mammal families